is a Japanese animated slice-of-life romantic comedy-drama film produced by Sublimation and Signal.MD and directed by Kyōhei Ishiguro. It premiered at the 2020 Shanghai International Film Festival. It was released to Japanese theaters on July 22, 2021, and on Netflix the same day internationally. Set in a rural part of Japan with a large shopping mall, the film follows two people who have trouble communicating with others. Yui "Cherry" Sakura is a shy boy who can only speak through his writing of haikus. Yuki aka "Smile", covers her mouth with a mask to hide her braces that try to fix her buckteeth and is an online influencer. A fateful meeting at the mall starts a romance between them.

Plot
At the local Oda Nouvelle Mall, Kouichi "Cherry" Sakura is working at an elderly care center for summer break. Cherry is a quiet and reserved boy who prefers to write haikus to express his feelings but struggles with reciting them in front of an audience. Amidst a chaotic chase between delinquent Beaver and the mall security, Cherry accidentally swaps phones with Smile, an online influencer who wears a face mask to hide her buckteeth. The pair become acquainted, and over time start to take an interest in each other's hobbies.

Smile starts working at the elderly care center and helps in rehearsing the Daruma Folk Song for the upcoming summer festival at the mall. Fujiyama, a vintage record shop owner and regular at the care center, tells Cherry and Smile of his wish to listen to the record "YAMAZAKURA" one more time, of which he only has the album cover. Cherry and Smile decide to help Fujiyama in finding the record and find out that it is a music recording made by Fujiyama's late wife.

Surmising that the record may be hidden somewhere in the shop, Cherry and Smile employ the help of several friends at the mall and scour the entire place, finally finding the record behind a refrigerator. While making preparations to play the record, Smile asks Cherry to watch the fireworks at the summer festival together, and Cherry accepts. However, Smile shortly after shatters the record while attempting to flatten it.

The next day, Cherry and Smile decide to apologize to Fujiyama once more but are sidetracked when it is discovered that Cherry will be moving away on the day of the festival. Disappointed, Smile bids farewell to an ashamed Cherry.

On the day of the festival, Smile presents Fujiyama with a reassembled record as an apology and is shocked to find a working copy repurposed as a wall clock in the elderly care center. Reenergized by this revelation, Smile devises a plan to play the record during the care center's performance at the summer festival. As Cherry's family car drives past the mall, he sees his haiku written about Smile spray painted on the street signs by Beaver. Mustering his courage, Cherry races to the festival and confesses his feelings for Smile in the form of a haiku atop a tower. As the fireworks show starts, Smile reciprocates by taking off her mask and revealing her smile.

In the post-credits scene, Cherry and Smile share a kiss while the old record plays.

Voice cast

Production and release
The film was originally announced at FlyingDog's Inu Fes concert. At the concert, it was also announced to be directed by Kyōhei Ishiguro, with animation production by Sublimation and Signal.MD, scripts by Dai Satō, character designs by Yukiko Aikei, and music by Kensuke Ushio. In December 2019, it was announced that it would open in Japanese theaters on May 15, 2020, and would star Ichikawa Somegorō VIII and Hana Sugisaki. In April 2020, it was announced the film would be delayed due to the COVID-19 pandemic. In November 2020, it was announced the film would premiere on June 25, 2021, following the delay. After being delayed again, the film opened in Japanese theaters on July 22, 2021. The film's main theme is "Cider no Yō ni Kotoba ga Wakiagaru" performed by never young beach. The insert song for the film is "YAMAZAKURA", performed by city pop artist Taeko Onuki.
Internationally, the film was streamed on Netflix both dubbed and subbed, starting on the same day as the Japanese theatrical release.

Manga adaptation
A manga adaptation of the film by Imo Ōno started serialization in Monthly Comic Alive on November 27, 2019. It ended in Monthly Comic Alive on March 27, 2021.

During their panel at New York Comic-Con 2022, Yen Press announced that they have licensed both the manga and light novel adaptations.

Reception

Kim Morrissy from Anime News Network praised the film's visuals, characters, and musical style, ultimately rating the film an A−.

In 2020, the film was nominated for the Mainichi Film Award for Best Animation Film. The film was also nominated for best film at the 2022 Crunchyroll Anime Awards.

References

External links
 Official website 
 
 
 

2020 films
2020 anime films
2020 romantic comedy-drama films
2020s teen comedy-drama films
2020s teen romance films
Animated drama films
Animated films about friendship
Anime comedy films
Anime postponed due to the COVID-19 pandemic
Anime with original screenplays
Comedy-drama anime and manga
Films postponed due to the COVID-19 pandemic
Japanese animated feature films
Japanese romantic comedy-drama films
Japanese teen comedy films
Japanese teen drama films
Films about social media
Media Factory manga
Romantic comedy anime and manga
Shochiku
Signal.MD
Yen Press titles